Language engineering involves the creation of natural language processing systems, whose cost and outputs are measurable and predictable. It is a distinct field contrasted to natural language processing and computational linguistics. A recent trend of language engineering is the use of Semantic Web technologies for the creation, archiving, processing, and retrieval of machine processable language data.

References

Natural language processing